Pseudoceratinidae is a family of sponges belonging to the order Verongiida.

Genera:
 Pseudoceratina Carter, 1885

References

Sponges